Colin Berkeley Moynihan, 4th Baronet, 4th Baron Moynihan (born 13 September 1955), is a British Olympic silver medalist, businessman, Conservative politician, and sports administrator. Lord Moynihan served as chairman of the British Olympic Association (BOA) from 2005 to 2012.

Biography

Early life
Moynihan is the son of Patrick Moynihan, 2nd Baron Moynihan, by his second wife June Elizabeth Hopkins, daughter of Arthur Stanley Covacic Hopkins. He was educated in the state system, including at secondary level, but studied at Monmouth School with a Music Scholarship from 1968 to 1973.

In 1974 he went up to University College, Oxford, graduating in 1977 with a BA in Politics, Philosophy and Economics (proceeding MA in 1982).  He was a "double blue" coxing the victorious Oxford University crew in the 1977 Oxford and Cambridge Boat Race and boxing against Cambridge in the Bantamweight division.  He beat Benazir Bhutto in the election for the Presidency of the Oxford Union in 1976 and won the Trans-Atlantic Universities Debating Competition the same year.  In 1977, he was awarded the Fiddian Post-Graduate Research Scholarship in Politics at Brasenose College, Oxford, which he did not take up in favour of working at the Westburn sugar refinery in Greenock for Tate & Lyle.

In 2007, he was awarded an Honorary Doctor of Philosophy by the London Metropolitan University.

Sport and the Olympics
In 1968 he won a gold medal in the Home Countries International Regatta, coxing the Welsh Senior Rowing IV. He was selected to tour the United States in 1973 as a member of the British Swifts Golf Team.

In 1978 Moynihan won a gold medal coxing the British Lightweight VIII at the 1978 FISA Lightweight Championships held in Copenhagen. In the 1980 Summer Olympics in Moscow, he ignored pressure to boycott for political reasons. He was cox for the Great Britain men's rowing VIII winning a silver medal; during the race, the steering cables to the rudder broke and Moynihan had to reach behind him to grasp the rudder bar. In this unorthodox manner, he steered the boat for most of the race. Most of the crew did not realise what had happened until after the race was over. In the 1981 Munich World Championships he coxed the British VIII to silver medal success.

Since 1978 he has, at different times, been a trustee of the Sports Aid Foundation, governor of the Sports Aid Trust, member of the Sports Council, member of the Central Council for Physical Recreation's Enquiry into Sponsorship of Sport, a trustee of the Oxford University Boat Club, member of the Major Spectator Sports Committee of the Central Council for Physical Recreation, a Steward of the British Boxing Board of Control, patron of the Bath University Amateur Boxing Club, patron of the Uphill Ski Club, president of the British Biathlon Union, president of the Welsh Amateur Rowing Association and chairman of the Paralympic World Cup in 2005. As a celebrated former University College Boat Club (Oxford) cox, he was invited to open the new University College Boathouse in Oxford in 2007.

Political career
Following his appointment in 1981 as one of Whitehall's earliest Political Advisers (working in the Foreign Office for Francis Pym, then Foreign Secretary), Moynihan was elected in 1983 as the Conservative Member of Parliament for Lewisham East. After chairing the World Youth Summit in Hiroshima and being an Official Commonwealth Observer at the Kenyan elections he became Parliamentary Private Secretary to Kenneth Clarke in a number of Departments. From 1987 to 1990 he served as Minister for Sport in Margaret Thatcher's government.  He was in this post at the time of the 1989 Hillsborough disaster in which 96 football fans were killed, and visited the scene with Margaret Thatcher to meet with senior South Yorkshire police officers on the day of the tragedy.

Moynihan was at the centre of a government proposal to bring in an ID Card scheme for supporters of English Football League teams in the wake of repeated outbreaks of hooliganism in the late 1980s. However, these plans had to be abandoned following the Hillsborough disaster and the subsequent Taylor Report, but he eventually piloted the Football Spectators Bill through Parliament to address football hooliganism which included the introduction of CCTV cameras in all 92 League Grounds and a range of other measures to tackle hooliganism.

From 1987 to 1990, Moynihan was Parliamentary Under Secretary of State at the Department of the Environment responsible for water privatisation, National Heritage, the National Rivers Authority, Inner City policy, planning and urban regeneration. During his time at the Department of the Environment he worked closely with Michael Howard who, when subsequently Leader of the Conservative Party, appointed Moynihan as his special adviser and chairman of the Conservative Campaigning Board. From 1990 to 1992 he was joint-Parliamentary Under-Secretary of State for Energy in both the Thatcher and Major governments responsible for oil, gas and renewable energy policy, a field in which he took a leading interest through the establishment of the first Government UK Renewable Energy Advisory Group which he chaired and the introduction of the first Non Fossil Fuel Obligation in Parliament which initiated Government support for renewable energy. During his time in the House of Commons, he chaired the All Party Parliamentary Group on Afghanistan, was Hon. Secretary of the Conservative Foreign Affairs Committee, the Parliamentary British Latin America Group and the Parliamentary Friends of the British Council. Whilst Moynihan's House of Commons seat was lost to Labour's Bridget Prentice in the General Election of 1992, his half-brother's death in 1991 opened the door to him for continuing his political career in the House of Lords, but he did not officially succeed to the title until 1997.

From 1997 to 2000, Moynihan was a Shadow Senior Front Bench Foreign Affairs Spokesman for the Conservative Party and was elected as one of the hereditary peers to remain in the Upper House following the House of Lords Act 1999. He was Shadow Minister for Minister for Sport in the House of Lords from July 2003 to February 2005.

Business career
Moynihan started his business career working consecutively in Glasgow, Liverpool and the London docks with Tate & Lyle. He remained with the company for 10 years with his last assignment being chief executive of Ridgways Tea & Coffee Merchants. After 10 years in Parliament, Moynihan returned to the business world as executive chairman and chief executive of Consort Resources Ltd and then director of Clipper Windpower plc and executive chairman of Clipper Windpower Europe Ltd. He has held a series of non-executive directorships including Ranger Oil Ltd, in Canada and ROWAN Companies Inc in the United States.  From 2005 to 2011 he was chairman of Pelamis Wave Power Ltd in Edinburgh.  He was a non-executive director of the Rowan Companies plc, where he chaired Rowan's Health, Safety and Environment Committee. He was chairman of the clean energy company, Hydrodec Group plc from 2012 to 2019. He is currently chairman and partner of the private equity group, Buckthorn Capital LLP. In January 2023, Amey plc named Moynihan as its new chair.

A Freeman of the City of London, he was later admitted as a Liveryman of the Haberdashers' Company in 1981 becoming a member of the Haberdashers' Court of Assistants in 2002, Third Warden from 2013 to 2014, chaired the Haberdashers' Education Foundation and was a member of the Haberdashers' Company Finance Committee.

Peerage
The House of Lords declared the Moynihan Barony dormant on the death of Moynihan's older half-brother, Antony Moynihan in 1991.  Colin Moynihan spent five years engaged in the complex claim to the title due to the number of the 3rd Baron's marriages and questions over the parentage and legitimacy of his sons.  In 1997 the Committee for Privileges adjudicated:

...that neither of the two sons purporting to be the sons of the Third Baron can, in fact, be an heir to the peerage. In the case of the elder, Andrew, the committee was shown overwhelming genetic evidence that he cannot be the son of the late Lord Moynihan; and so far as the younger, Daniel, is concerned, the evidence clearly shows that he is the child of a bigamous marriage and is therefore illegitimate. In those circumstances, it is clear beyond doubt that the petitioner, Colin Moynihan, must be the rightful heir and that his Petitions must succeed.

A writ of summons was issued on 30 May 1997 confirming Colin Moynihan in the title of Baron Moynihan.

Lord Moynihan also succeeded as a baronet, a title granted to the first holder in 1922.

British Olympic Association
On 5 October 2005, Moynihan was elected chairman of the British Olympic Association (BOA), for the run-up to the 2012 London Olympic Games. He beat the 1968 Olympic hurdles champion, David Hemery, by a vote of 28 to 15. He was re-elected unopposed in 2008.

He has served on a number of committees and commissions for the International Olympic Committee including the IOC International Relations Commission, the IOC 2009 Congress Editorial Committee and as an executive board member of the Association of National Olympic Committees from 2006 to 2011.  He was elected to the European Olympic Committee Executive Board in 2009. In the context of the London 2012 Olympic Games, Lord Moynihan was a director of the London Organising Committee of the Olympic and Paralympic Games (LOCOG), where he also served on the LOCOG Audit Committee; a trustee of International Inspiration and a member of the Olympic Board, which had oversight of the London 2012 Games.

Chairmanship controversy and resignation
In March 2011, it was reported that Moynihan's future as BOA chairman seemed in doubt, because of a dispute with the organisers of the London 2012 Olympics which revolved around the funding of the Paralympics. Moynihan led the BOA in challenging a "clear cut" International Olympic Committee rule that shares of any profit from the 2012 Games must take into account the costs of Paralympic games.  His costly pursuit of this legal action was considered deeply embarrassing to BOA's National Olympic Committee members. In April 2011 the dispute with the London Organising Committee who were supported by the International Olympic Committee was resolved with the BOA, when the latter backed down from its demands. In April 2011 the dispute with the London Organising Committee who were supported by the International Olympic Committee was resolved with the BOA.

During the 2012 Summer Olympics in London, Lord Moynihan issued a rallying cry for British state schools to do more to foster sport.

The day after the closing ceremony, Lord Moynihan resigned, quipping, "I notice politicians have enjoyed these Games – I understand why Roman Emperors were in favour of annual Games!"

Moynihan was awarded the Olympic Order by the president of the International Olympic Committee at the completion of the London Summer Games.

Personal life
Lord Moynihan married Gaynor-Louise Metcalf in 1992, the marriage was dissolved in 2016. They have two sons and a daughter:

 Hon. Nicholas Ewen Berkeley Moynihan (born 31 March 1994)
 Hon. George Edward Berkeley Moynihan (born 4 June 1995)
 Hon. India Isabella Sarah Moynihan (born 2 September 1997)

Artistic recognition
Lord Moynihan formed part of the "Living Legends" art exhibition of 2014, with his head being body-cast by sculptor Louise Giblin (cast in 2012).

Styles

 13 September 1955 – 1983: The Honourable Colin Moynihan
 1983–1992: The Honourable Colin Moynihan MP
 1992–1997: The Honourable Colin Moynihan
 1997–present: The Right Honourable The Lord Moynihan

Although styled Lord Moynihan by some following the death of his half-brother, it was not until the Committee for Privileges found in his favour could he be properly so styled or take his seat in the House of Lords.

See also
 Baron Moynihan
 Members of the House of Lords
 List of MPs elected in the 1983 United Kingdom general election and 1987
 Rowing at the 1980 Summer Olympics

Arms

References

External links
 
 Debrett's People of Today
 Independent Sports Review information
 Ugandan Discussions – on the cover of Private Eye (Issue 692, 24 June 1988)
 www.olympic.org

1955 births
Living people
People educated at Monmouth School for Boys
Alumni of University College, Oxford
Barons in the Peerage of the United Kingdom
British male rowers
Conservative Party (UK) hereditary peers
Conservative Party (UK) MPs for English constituencies
Coxswains (rowing)
Olympic medalists in rowing
Members of the Bow Group
Olympic silver medallists for Great Britain
Olympic rowers of Great Britain
Rowers at the 1980 Summer Olympics
Rowers at the 1984 Summer Olympics
UK MPs 1983–1987
UK MPs 1987–1992
UK MPs who inherited peerages
English people of Irish descent
British sportsperson-politicians
Recipients of the Olympic Order
World Rowing Championships medalists for Great Britain
Medalists at the 1980 Summer Olympics
Presidents of the Oxford Union
Oxcentrics members
Hereditary peers elected under the House of Lords Act 1999